Michael Alex Conley Jr. (born October 11, 1987) is an American professional basketball player for the Minnesota Timberwolves of the National Basketball Association (NBA). He was drafted as the fourth overall pick in the 2007 NBA draft by the Memphis Grizzlies. Conley spent 12 seasons with the Grizzlies and became the team's all time leading scorer before being traded to the Utah Jazz in 2019, then traded again to the Timberwolves in 2023.

His father, Mike Conley Sr., was an Olympic gold and silver medalist in track and field.

College career
In his freshman year at Ohio State, Conley averaged 11.3 points and led the Big Ten Conference in assists with 6.1 per game. Conley, together with fellow freshman star Greg Oden, led the Buckeyes to a Big Ten conference championship and a runner-up finish in the NCAA Tournament.

On the road to the championship game, the Buckeyes defeated Central Connecticut State, Xavier, Tennessee, Memphis, and Georgetown, only to lose in the championship game to the repeat national champions Florida. Conley's best performance in the tournament came in the contest against Xavier. He recorded 21 points, 4 assists, 2 steals, and 3 blocks as Ohio State defeated the Musketeers in overtime. Greg Oden fouled out in regulation, and Conley scored 11 of his 21 points in the extra period to lead the Buckeyes to a victory.

Ending the season with totals of 441 points and 238 assists, Conley was named to the All-Big Ten First Team.

Following his freshman season, Conley announced his intention to enter the 2007 NBA draft along with Oden. He initially did not sign with an agent in order to preserve his eligibility to withdraw from the draft but ended up signing with his father several weeks before the draft.

Professional career

Memphis Grizzlies (2007–2019)

2007–2010: Early years 
Conley joined fellow Buckeyes Greg Oden and Daequan Cook in declaring for the 2007 NBA draft; both Conley and Oden were represented by Conley's father, whom the NBA certified as an agent earlier in the year. Conley was drafted by the Memphis Grizzlies as the fourth overall pick after Greg Oden, Kevin Durant, and Al Horford.

Conley had his first major appearances in January 2008. In Conley's first five career games, he scored 5, 10, 11, 11, and 15 points, respectively. He scored a season-high 20 points with 7 assists in a 134–124 loss to the Cleveland Cavaliers. Conley finished his rookie year with averages of 9.4 points and 4.2 assists per game.

Conley started his sophomore campaign competing with Kyle Lowry for minutes. On January 25, 2009, the Grizzlies made Lionel Hollins the head coach after the firing of Marc Iavaroni. On February 19, 2009, Lowry was traded to the Houston Rockets, which put Conley in the starting lineup. He averaged 10.8 points and 4.3 assists per game for the year.

Conley cemented his role as a full-time starter for the Grizzlies in 2009. He posted a season-high of 25 points on March 31, 2010, during a 102–106 loss to the Dallas Mavericks. He averaged 12.0 points and 5.3 assists on the season.

2010–2014: All-Defensive Team selection and Conference finals 
On November 30, 2010, Conley put up a season-high 28 points in a 98–96 victory over the Los Angeles Lakers. Conley averaged 13.7 and 6.5 assists on the year to help the Grizzlies make the playoffs for the first time in five years. Entering with the eighth seed in the Western Conference, they were matched up in the first round with the top-seeded San Antonio Spurs. Conley and the Grizzlies went on to defeat the Spurs in six games and make NBA history as only the second eighth-seeded team to defeat a first seed in a seven-game series. They then lost to the Oklahoma City Thunder in the Semifinals after seven games.

In the shortened lockout season, Conley played 62 of the Grizzlies' 66 games, during which he averaged 12.7 points and 6.5 assists. Conley and the Grizzlies would make the playoffs but fell in the first round to the Los Angeles Clippers in seven games.

On the year, Conley averaged 14.6 points, 6.1 assists, and 2.8 rebounds per game as the Grizzlies made the playoffs once again. They eliminated the Los Angeles Clippers and the Oklahoma City Thunder to reach the Western Conference Finals for the first time in franchise history. However, they then lost to the San Antonio Spurs in four games. It was in this season that Conley was named to the NBA All-Defensive Second Team for the first time.
Conley averaged a career-high 17.2 points, 6.0 assists, and 2.9 rebounds per game on the year as the Grizzles made the playoffs for the fourth consecutive season. They were then eliminated in the first round by the Oklahoma City Thunder in a seven game series. Conley was the recipient of the NBA Sportsmanship Award.

2014–2019: Playoff disappointment 
On December 13, 2014, Conley scored a career-high 36 points to help the Grizzlies defeat the Philadelphia 76ers, 120–115, in overtime. The Grizzlies finished the season as the fifth seed in the Western Conference, making the playoffs once again. They then faced the Portland Trail Blazers in the first round and defeated them in five games. Near the end of Game Three of the series, Conley suffered a facial fracture, which forced him to miss the rest of the first round. He also missed Game One of the Semifinals against the Golden State Warriors. But Conley returned in Game Two of the series; and, while donning a protective mask, he scored 21 points to lead Memphis to a victory. However, Memphis eventually lost to the Warriors in six games.

In 2014, Conley received what would have been the first technical foul of his NBA career, but it was overturned by league officials the following day; as of January 2023 he has yet to record a technical, having by far the longest streak without one of any NBA player.

On October 31, 2015, Conley surpassed Shareef Abdur-Rahim (7,801) for third on the Grizzlies' career scoring list. He scored 22 points against the Brooklyn Nets to finish the game with 7,821 career points. On January 18, 2016, Conley returned to the lineup after missing six games with a sore left Achilles and recorded his third double-double of the season with 15 points and 10 assists, helping the Grizzlies defeat the New Orleans Pelicans 101–99. Earlier that day, he was named one of the 30 finalists for the 2016 U.S. Olympic team. On March 12, he was ruled out for three to four weeks with a left foot injury. He was later ruled out for the rest of the season on April 4 following a re-evaluation by team doctors, and hoping to return during playoffs. The injury-riddled Grizzlies finished seventh in the Western Conference, and without Conley and Marc Gasol, they were swept by the San Antonio Spurs in the first round of the playoffs. On April 23, Conley was awarded the NBA Sportsmanship Award for the second time.

On July 14, 2016, Conley re-signed with the Grizzlies. His reported five-year, $153 million deal was the greatest contract by total value in NBA history at that point in time. On November 16, 2016, he scored 30 points and hit a career-high-tying seven three-pointers in a 111–107 win over the Los Angeles Clippers. On November 29, he was ruled out for six to eight weeks with a fractured vertebrae. He returned to action on December 16 after missing nine games. In the Grizzlies' 96–92 loss to the Sacramento Kings, Conley passed Pau Gasol to become the all-time leading scorer in Grizzlies franchise history. On January 30, 2017, he scored 38 points in a 115–98 win over the Phoenix Suns. Conley matched his career best with seven three-pointers (in 10 attempts) and made 12 of 18 shots overall in his fourth 30-point game of the season—he previously had just five over his entire career. On February 15 against New Orleans, Conley passed Mike Miller for the most three-pointers in franchise history with 845. On March 29, he matched his career-high with seven three-pointers on his way to 36 points, helping the Grizzlies rout the Indiana Pacers 110–97.

On April 22, 2017, Conley scored a franchise postseason record 35 points in a 110–108 overtime win over the San Antonio Spurs. The win tied the first-round series at 2–2.

Conley appeared in 12 of the Grizzlies' first 13 games of the 2017–18 season before suffering a left Achilles injury. On January 27, 2018, he was ruled out for the rest of the season after requiring surgery to smooth a small bone protrusion in his left heel.

In the Grizzlies' season opener on October 17, 2018, Conley made his first regular season appearance since November 2017 after missing 70 games in 2017–18. He played nearly 29 minutes, scored 11 points and had three assists and one steal in a 111–83 loss to the Indiana Pacers. On November 2, he scored a season-high 28 points in a 110–100 win over the Utah Jazz. On November 10, he set a new season-high with 32 points in a 112–106 overtime win over the Philadelphia 76ers. On November 30, Conley improved his season-high scoring to 37 points and also made 10 assists in a 131–125 double-overtime win over the Brooklyn Nets. On March 5, 2019, Conley scored a career-high 40 points in a Grizzlies' 120–111 win over the Portland Trail Blazers. He was scoreless in the first quarter, Conley scored 19 of his career-high 40 points in the fourth quarter. On March 11, he was named Western Conference Player of the Week for games played from March 4 to March 10. It marked his first career Player of the Week award. On March 27, in a 118–103 loss to the Golden State Warriors, Conley passed Marc Gasol to become the Grizzlies' all-time leader in career points.

Utah Jazz (2019–2023)

2019–2021: First All-Star selection 
On July 6, 2019, Conley was traded to the Utah Jazz in exchange for Grayson Allen, Jae Crowder, Kyle Korver, the draft rights to Darius Bazley, and a protected first round pick. Conley made his Jazz debut on October 23, recording five points and five assists in a 100–95 win over the Oklahoma City Thunder. On October 30, he scored a season-high 29 points, alongside five assists and two steals, in a 110–96 win over the Los Angeles Clippers. In 2020, due to the suspension of the NBA season because of the COVID-19 pandemic, the NBA produced a televised event in which NBA and WNBA players participated in a virtual H–O–R–S–E competition while quarantining at their respective homes. The NBA raised $200,000 for charities while Conley won the first virtual NBA H–O–R–S–E Competition, to become the inaugural "H.O.R.S.E Champion".

On August 21, 2020, during the first round of the playoffs, Conley recorded 27 points and a playoff career-high seven 3-pointers in a 124–87 Game 3 win over the Denver Nuggets. He had missed the first two games of the series after being quarantined. Two days later, Conley logged 26 points, four assists and two steals in a 129–127 Game 4 win. Despite taking a 3–1 series lead, the Jazz lost in seven games to the Nuggets. After the 2019–20 season, Conley declined to exercise the early termination option on his contract, and he was owed $34.5 million in the fifth and final year of his contract in 2020–21.

On January 1, 2021, Conley scored a season-high 33 points and added seven assists, two rebounds, and one steal in a 106–100 win against the Los Angeles Clippers. He was named an All-Star for the first time in his career as it was announced that he would be a reserve for the 2021 NBA All-Star Game, replacing the injured Devin Booker. His 14-year wait is the longest ever for a first time All-Star. He recorded three points, one rebound, and two assists in 12 minutes in the game. Conley was also announced as Booker's replacement in the Three-Point Contest, where he competed against teammate Donovan Mitchell. Conley lost in the final round to Stephen Curry, 28–27.

On May 29, during the first round of the playoffs, Conley scored 27 points and matched his playoff career-high of seven 3-pointers in a 121–111 Game 3 win over the Memphis Grizzlies. He missed the first five games of the Jazz's second round series versus the Los Angeles Clippers due to a strained right hamstring. Conley returned to the lineup in Game 6, logging five points and three assists in a 119–131 loss that saw the Jazz get eliminated from the playoffs.

2021–2023: First-round exit and roster retool 
On August 6, 2021, Conley re-signed with the Jazz on a reported three-year, $68–72.5 million contract. On November 2, he scored a season-high 30 points in a 119–113 win over the Sacramento Kings. The Jazz were eliminated in the first round of the playoffs by the Dallas Mavericks, with Conley averaging only 9.2 points and 4.8 assists per game during the 2–4 series defeat.

After the 2021–22 season, the Jazz underwent a retool that saw them trade away their franchise players, All-Stars Donovan Mitchell and Rudy Gobert. Conley admitted that he expected to be moved, stating, "I was just like everybody else. I was waiting to get the phone call that I was going somewhere else." However, he stayed in Utah to start off the 2022–23 season. Conley made his season debut on October 19, recording 13 points, eight assists and two steals in a 123–102 win over the Denver Nuggets.

Minnesota Timberwolves (2023–present)
On February 9, 2023, Conley Jr. was traded to the Minnesota Timberwolves in a three-team trade involving the Los Angeles Lakers reuniting with his former Grizzlies teammate Kyle Anderson and Jazz teammate Rudy Gobert. He made his Timberwolves debut a day later, recording nine points, three assists and two steals in a 128–107 loss to the Memphis Grizzlies.

Career statistics

NBA

Regular season

|-
| style="text-align:left;"|
| style="text-align:left;"|Memphis
| 53 || 46 || 26.1 || .428 || .330 || .732 || 2.6 || 4.2 || .8 || .0 || 9.4
|-
| style="text-align:left;"|
| style="text-align:left;"|Memphis
| style="background:#cfecec;"|  82* || 61 || 30.6 || .442 || .406 || .817 || 3.4 || 4.3 || 1.1 || .1 || 10.9
|-
| style="text-align:left;"|
| style="text-align:left;"|Memphis
| 80 || 80 || 32.1 || .445 || .387 || .743 || 2.4 || 5.3 || 1.4 || .2 || 12.0
|-
| style="text-align:left;"|
| style="text-align:left;"|Memphis
| 81 || 81 || 35.5 || .444 || .369 || .733 || 3.0 || 6.5 || 1.8 || .2 || 13.7
|-
| style="text-align:left;"|
| style="text-align:left;"|Memphis
| 62 || 61 || 35.1 || .433 || .377 || .861 || 2.5 || 6.5 || 2.2 || .2 || 12.7
|-
| style="text-align:left;"|
| style="text-align:left;"|Memphis
| 80 || 80 || 34.5 || .440 || .362 || .830 || 2.8 || 6.1 || 2.2 || .3 || 14.6
|-
| style="text-align:left;"|
| style="text-align:left;"|Memphis
| 73 || 73 || 33.5 || .450 || .361 || .815 || 2.9 || 6.0 || 1.5 || .2 || 17.2
|-
| style="text-align:left;"|
| style="text-align:left;"|Memphis
| 70 || 70 || 31.8 || .446 || .386 || .859 || 3.0 || 5.4 || 1.3 || .2 || 15.8
|-
| style="text-align:left;"|
| style="text-align:left;"|Memphis
| 56 || 56 || 31.4 || .422 || .363 || .834 || 2.9 || 6.1 || 1.2 || .3 || 15.3
|-
| style="text-align:left;"|
| style="text-align:left;"|Memphis
| 69 || 68 || 33.2 || .459 || .407 || .859 || 3.5 || 6.3 || 1.3 || .3 || 20.5
|-
| style="text-align:left;"|
| style="text-align:left;"|Memphis
| 12 || 12 || 31.1 || .381 || .312 || .803 || 2.3 || 4.1 || 1.0 || .3 || 17.1
|-
| style="text-align:left;"|
| style="text-align:left;"|Memphis
| 70 || 70 || 33.5 || .438 || .364 || .845 || 3.4 || 6.4 || 1.3 || .3 || 21.1 
|-
| style="text-align:left;"|
| style="text-align:left;"|Utah
| 47 || 41 || 29.0 || .409 || .375 || .827 || 3.2 || 4.4 || .8 || .1 || 14.4 
|-
| style="text-align:left;"|
| style="text-align:left;"|Utah
| 51 || 51 || 29.4 || .444 || .412 || .852 || 3.5 || 6.0 || 1.4 || .2 || 16.2 
|-
| style="text-align:left;"|
| style="text-align:left;"|Utah
| 72 || 72 || 28.6 || .435 || .408 || .796 || 3.0 || 5.3 || 1.3 || .3 || 13.7
|-
| style="text-align:left;"|
| style="text-align:left;"|Utah
| 43 || 42 || 29.7 || .408 || .362 || .813 || 2.5 || 7.7 || 1.0 || .2 || 10.7
|- class="sortbottom"
| style="text-align:center;" colspan="2"|Career
| 1,001 || 964 || 31.9 || .438 || .381 || .819 || 3.0 || 5.7 || 1.4 || .2 || 14.7
|-
| style="text-align:center;" colspan="2"|All-Star
| 1 || 0 || 13.0 || .167 || .200 || .000 || 1.0 || 2.0 || 1.0 || 0.0 || 3.0

Playoffs

|-
| style="text-align:left;"|2011
| style="text-align:left;"|Memphis
| 13 || 13 || 39.0 || .388 || .297 || .830 || 3.8 || 6.4 || 1.1 || .2 || 15.2
|-
| style="text-align:left;"|2012
| style="text-align:left;"|Memphis
| 7 || 7 || 39.6 || .421 || .500 || .750 || 3.3 || 7.1 || .9 || .0 || 14.1
|-
| style="text-align:left;"|2013
| style="text-align:left;"|Memphis
| 15 || 15 || 38.3 || .384 || .281 || .763 || 4.7 || 7.1 || 1.7 || .3 || 17.0
|-
| style="text-align:left;"|2014
| style="text-align:left;"|Memphis
| 7 || 7 || 38.1 || .431 || .111 || .769 || 4.6 || 7.9 || 2.0 || .1 || 15.9
|-
| style="text-align:left;"|2015
| style="text-align:left;"|Memphis
| 8 || 8 || 30.4 || .427 || .303 || .821 || 1.1 || 5.0 || 1.4 || .0 || 14.4
|-
| style="text-align:left;"|2017
| style="text-align:left;"|Memphis
| 6 || 6 || 37.3 || .485 || .447 || .838 || 3.3 || 7.0 || 1.7 || .5 || 24.7
|-
| style="text-align:left;"|2020
| style="text-align:left;"|Utah
| 5 || 5 || 33.0 || .484 || .529 || .864 || 2.8 || 5.2 || 1.6 || .5 || 19.8
|-
| style="text-align:left;"|2021
| style="text-align:left;"|Utah
| 6 || 6 || 29.3 || .426 || .486 || 1.000 || 3.5 || 7.7 || .2 || .2 || 15.3
|-
| style="text-align:left;"|2022
| style="text-align:left;"|Utah
| 6 || 6 || 29.0 || .333 || .200 || .800 || 3.2 || 4.8 || .8 || .3 || 9.2
|- class="sortbottom"
| style="text-align:center;" colspan="2"|Career
| 73 || 73 || 35.7 || .415 || .350 || .807 || 3.5 || 6.5 || 1.3 || .2 || 16.0

College

|-
| style="text-align:left;"|2006–07
| style="text-align:left;"|Ohio State
| 39 || 39 || 31.6 || .518 || .304 || .694 || 3.4 || 6.1 || 2.2 || .3 || 11.3
|-
| style="text-align:center;" colspan="2"|Career
| 39 || 39 || 31.6 || .518 || .304 || .694 || 3.4 || 6.1 || 2.2 || .3 || 11.3

Personal life
Conley is a Christian and has spoken about his faith, saying, "Jesus means the world. Jesus means everything."

Conley's father is Mike Conley Sr., an Olympic gold and silver medalist in the triple jump. He is also the nephew of former American football linebacker Steve Conley.

On July 5, 2014, Conley married his girlfriend Mary Peluso, whom he met at Ohio State. The couple have three sons together.

See also

 2006 high school boys basketball All-Americans
 List of National Basketball Association career assists leaders
 List of National Basketball Association career 3-point scoring leaders
 List of National Basketball Association franchise career scoring leaders

References

External links

Ohio State Buckeyes bio

1987 births
Living people
20th-century African-American people
21st-century African-American sportspeople
African-American basketball players
American men's basketball players
Basketball players from Arkansas
Basketball players from Indianapolis
McDonald's High School All-Americans
Memphis Grizzlies draft picks
Memphis Grizzlies players
Minnesota Timberwolves players
National Basketball Association All-Stars
Ohio State Buckeyes men's basketball players
Parade High School All-Americans (boys' basketball)
Point guards
Sportspeople from Fayetteville, Arkansas
Utah Jazz players